Berikh Subregion is a subregion in the central Maekel region of Eritrea. Includes Berikh district and the capital lies at Berikh.

References

Awate.com: Martyr Statistics

Central Region (Eritrea)
Subregions of Eritrea